Klokslag Twaalf  is a 1936 Dutch crime film drama directed by Léo Joannon.

Cast
Louis De Bree	... 	Jean Verdier
Fien de la Mar	... 	Matia
Coen Hissink	
Jules Verstraete		
Piet Te Nuyl

External links 
 

1936 films
Dutch black-and-white films
1936 crime drama films
Films directed by Léo Joannon
Dutch multilingual films
Dutch crime drama films
1936 multilingual films